Led Zeppelin's 1968/1969 tour of North America was the first concert tour of the United States and Canada by the English rock band. The tour commenced on 26 December 1968 and concluded on 16 February 1969. It was important for the band, as their popularity grew substantially because of the concerts and helped them reach significant commercial success in the US, which translated to sales elsewhere.

Overview
The genesis of this tour was the cancellation of a concert tour by the Jeff Beck Group, which happened to be managed out of the same office occupied by Led Zeppelin's manager Peter Grant. Grant contacted the promoters and convinced them to take on Led Zeppelin instead.

To help publicise the band in America before the tour, Grant sent white label advance copies of the band's debut album to key FM radio stations.  The album itself was issued on 12 January, almost mid-way through the tour. According to tour manager Richard Cole, the tour was underwritten by Grant, guitarist Jimmy Page, and bass player John Paul Jones, while singer Robert Plant and drummer John Bonham were paid a salary.

For this stint of concerts, Led Zeppelin initially played as the support act for bands such as Vanilla Fudge and Iron Butterfly (both of which were also contracted to Atlantic Records) and Country Joe & the Fish. However, as the tour progressed, it became apparent that Led Zeppelin was easily outshining the headline acts. Guitarist Jimmy Page noticed that by the time the group reached San Francisco, other groups were not turning up, and Led Zeppelin were then headliners.

Bassist John Paul Jones believed the reason their concerts were popular was because they played tightly and quickly without many delays, saying "we would just go on and go 'bang bang bang' with three driven songs with solos", which other groups did not do.

In one famous concert, Led Zeppelin's final of four nights performed at the Boston Tea Party, the band played for more than four hours with only one album worth of material. They played the same set twice, and then played an improvised set with covers from other groups such as the Who, Rolling Stones and the Beatles. Grant was delighted with the group's performance, and the band then realised then that they would be a very successful rock band.

It was during this tour that Led Zeppelin's drummer, John Bonham, developed a close friendship with the drummer of Vanilla Fudge, Carmine Appice.

The average fee charged by Led Zeppelin for a concert during this tour was around $1,500. It has been stated that for one show they performed for a mere $320.  Figures like these would soon be dwarfed by the six-figure sums routinely demanded, and received, by Led Zeppelin on subsequent tours as their popularity skyrocketed. Peter Grant recalled that "The Yardbirds had been getting $2,500 a night but people like Bill Graham had faith in us and so did the kids who saw it." Grant, who was unable to attend the tour with the group, also stated:

Tour set list
Although there was some variation, a fairly typical set list for the tour was:

"Train Kept A-Rollin'" (Bradshaw, Kay, Mann)
"I Can't Quit You Baby" (Dixon)
"As Long As I Have You" (Mimms)
"Dazed and Confused" (Page)
"You Shook Me" (Dixon, Lenoir)
"White Summer"/"Black Mountain Side" (Page)
"Pat's Delight" (Bonham)
"Babe I'm Gonna Leave You" (Bredon, Page, Plant)
"How Many More Times" (Bonham, Jones, Page)
"Killing Floor" (Burnett)
"For Your Love" (Gouldman)
"Communication Breakdown" (Bonham, John Paul Jones, Page)

Tour dates

See also

Led Zeppelin Played Here

References

External links
Comprehensive archive of known concert appearances by Led Zeppelin (official website)

Led Zeppelin concert tours
1968 concert tours
1969 concert tours
1968 in North America
1969 in North America